Cologne is one of the five governmental districts of the German Federal State of North Rhine-Westphalia. It is located in the south-west of that state and covers the hills of the Eifel as well as the Bergisches Land.

It was created in 1815, when Prussia reorganised its internal administration. In 1972 the Regierungsbezirk Aachen was incorporated.

Economy 
The Gross domestic product (GDP) of the region was 190.8 billion € in 2018, accounting for 5.7% of German economic output. GDP per capita adjusted for purchasing power was 39,300 € or 130% of the EU27 average in the same year. The GDP per employee was 110% of the EU average.

External links

References

 

NUTS 2 statistical regions of the European Union
Geography of North Rhine-Westphalia
Rhineland
Government regions of Germany
Government regions of Prussia
States and territories established in 1815
1815 establishments in Prussia